Box Elder or Boxelder may refer to:

Flora and fauna
Box elder or Acer negundo, a species of maple
Boxelder bug, an insect which feeds on maple trees

Communities
Box Elder, Colorado
Box Elder, Montana, a census-designated place (CDP) in Chouteau and Hill counties
Box Elder, South Dakota, a city in Meade and Pennington counties
Box Elder County, Utah, a county in Utah
Brigham City, Utah, formerly known as Box Elder
Box Elder, Nebraska, a community located north of McCook, Nebraska

Streams
Box Elder Creek (Colorado), a tributary of the South Platte River
Boxelder Creek (Belle Fourche River), a stream in South Dakota
Boxelder Creek (Cheyenne River), a stream in South Dakota
Boxelder Creek (Grand River), a stream in South Dakota

Media
Box Elders, a punk band from Omaha, Nebraska
"Box Elder", a song by Pavement, released on the Slay Tracks: 1933–1969 EP (1989)
Box Elder (film), a 2008 independent movie